Paul McDermott is an Australian comedian.

Paul McDermott may also refer to:

 Paul McDermott (documentarian), Irish broadcaster
 Paul McDermott (judge) (born 1959), Irish judge
 Paul Anthony McDermott (1972–2019), Irish lawyer and academic
 Paul Mac (Paul Francis McDermott, born 1965), Australian electropop musician